, is a Japanese singer and actor. He is a member of the idol group SixTONES.

Background 
Matsumura was born in Shizuoka and has one older brother who is 3 years his senior. He holds a black belt in Karate and has also won some tournaments. His best achievements include ranking 2nd in the prefectural tournament and qualifying for the national tournament. He quit Karate in 2009 to focus on his entertainment career.

He was motivated to send in his application to the talent agency Johnny & Associates by his admiration toward Tomohisa Yamashita after watching the drama Kurosagi.

Career
Matsumura joined the talent agency Johnny & Associates in 2009 and soon made a CD debut as a part of the temporary units Yuma Nakayama w/B.I.Shadow and NYC boys.

He made his acting debut in NTV's Shiritsu Bakaleya Koukou in 2012. His acting was praised by Johnny Kitagawa and he later landed a main role in TBS' golden hour drama Kuro no Onna Kyoushi.

In 2013, Matsumura ranked 1st in popular idol magazine Myojo's annual poll "Jr's Most Wanted As Lover". In March 2014, he starred as main member in Johnny's Jr new TV variety show produced by TV Asahi, Gamushara which ended its airing the same month in 2016.
 
During concert Johnny's Ginza, which was held at
Tokyo's Theatre Crea in May 2015, Matsumura became part of newly announced Johnny's Jr. unit called SixTONES with most of Bakaleya main cast as his group members. In the same year, he also co-starred with two of his group members, Jesse and Juri Tanaka in their first lead roles in the movie Vanilla Boy which premiered nationwide in September 2016.

Along with SixTONES, Matsumura has starred in few musical stage shows such as the long historic Shounentachi, for every year since 2015–2017 with other Johnny's Jr. group Snow Man.

Filmography

Television

Film

Other 
Matsumura is a ”pitied” character in his group; however he is also often described as being sexy and dog-like at the same time. Many of his fans refer to him as ”shiba inu” because of his cute face and gestures. Some of his nicknames are "Hokkun" and "Hokucha".

He was known among SixTONES fans as being "unfriendly" with one of his group members, Taiga Kyomoto, but they are quite friendly nowadays.

Awards

References

External links
Johnny's Net

1995 births
Japanese idols
Japanese male pop singers
Japanese male television actors
Japanese male film actors
Living people
Johnny & Associates
21st-century Japanese singers
21st-century Japanese male singers
Horikoshi High School alumni